The 2010 Ottawa municipal election was a municipal election that was held on October 25, 2010, to elect the mayor of Ottawa, Ottawa City Council and the Ottawa-Carleton Public and Catholic School Boards. The election was held on the same date as elections in every other municipality in Ontario.

Background
In Ottawa's 2006 municipal election, newcomer Larry O'Brien defeated former city councillor Alex Munter and then-incumbent Bob Chiarelli in an election largely based on the expansion of Ottawa's light rail transit system. A Léger Marketing poll published by the Ottawa Sun on May 26, 2007 put O'Brien's approval ratings at 24%, and reported that if an election were held that day, he and Munter would have been tied with 35% of the vote of those surveyed.

Terry Kilrea, who had dropped out of the previous mayoral race on August 30, 2006, accused O'Brien of offering him up to $30,000 and a political appointment if Kilrea would withdraw from that race and support O'Brien. On August 5, 2009, Larry O'Brien was acquitted of bribery charges stemming from this accusation.

Alex Munter, the second-place candidate in 2006, did not run in the 2010 election. Bob Chiarelli, mayor from 1997–2006, was elected in a March 2010 by-election to the Legislative Assembly of Ontario, replacing another former mayor, Jim Watson, who left the legislative seat to run in the 2010 mayoral race.

On June 30, O'Brien announced that he would seek another term as mayor.

An Ottawa Citizen poll conducted in June 2010 showed public transit to the most important policy issue among city voters, ahead of taxes and the Lansdowne Park redevelopment.

The race featured the largest number of candidates for mayor and for city council in the history of Ottawa.

Turnout for the election was 44%, down 10% from 2006. The election saw seven incumbents go down to defeat (including the mayor). Except for mayor, the city had not seen an incumbent councillor lose since amalgamation.

Watson won nearly half of the votes. His strongest wards were in the city's East end, despite having never represented the area (except as mayor). His highest vote percentage was in Rideau-Vanier Ward. Watson's worst wards were the three rural wards which were the only three wards he lost. His worst ward was West Carleton-March Ward.

O'Brien received about one quarter of the votes in the city. He won just three wards, in Ottawa's rural areas. The suburbs did not vote for him the way they did in 2006, and his worst areas were again in central Ottawa. Doucet's strongest ward was Capital Ward, the ward he represented on council. He was unable to win it however, losing to Watson who also represented the ward in the 1990s. Doucet's strength was in the central part of the city, and his worst areas were the rural areas. Haydon finished fourth in the race. His strongest areas in the rural parts of the city, and in Nepean, a city of which he was once mayor. He did not perform well in his home ward however, of Gloucester-South Nepean. His worst areas were in the central part of the city.

Candidates

Cesar Bello
Bello, 46, was a businessperson who has lived in Ottawa for 20 years. He holds a Ph.D. in Social Anthropology. He was the organizing chair of the Green Party of Canada.  He was the owner and director of Mundo en Espanol, a Spanish language newspaper in the Ottawa-Gatineau area.Endorsements:Date of announcement: April 16, 2010Date registered: April 16, 2010Date campaign launched: N/AWebsite: www.cesarbello.ca

Idris Ben-Tahir
Ben-Tahir, 71 was born in India. He moved to Canada in 1960, and is an information scientist. He once worked for the public service. He lives in Somerset Ward. In 2006, he ran for the Conservative Party of Canada nomination in Ottawa Centre, but lost. He ran for city council in 2006 in Somerset Ward that year and lost.

Date registered: September 10, 2010
Date campaign launched: N/A

Clive Doucet
Doucet, 64, was the city councillor for Capital Ward. He represented Capital Ward on the Ottawa-Carleton Regional Council from 1997 to 2000 and on Ottawa City Council since 2000. Along with Bob Chiarelli, he spearheaded the development of Ottawa's O-Train. Doucet graduated from the University of Toronto, receiving a B.A. in Urban Anthropology. He received a master's degree in the same field from the Université de Montréal. Before being elected, he served as a public servant both on a provincial and federal level. He has lived in Ottawa since 1972, and is also an accomplished writer. Doucet has, in the past, been associated with progressive initiatives at the municipal level and has worked across party lines with other levels of government to further regional interests.     He was endorsed by the New Democratic Party while running for City Council. 

Endorsements: Xtra Ottawa, Canadian Institute for Business and the Environment, The Safari Post, Mike Cassidy, former Ontario NDP leader, Ed Broadbent, former NDP leader, Mike Bryan, former Goulbourn Township Councillor
Date of announcement: July 6, 2010
Date registered: July 6, 2010
Website: www.clivedoucet.com

Joseph Furtenbacher
Furtenbacher, 50, was a polymathic macroethicist. He used to be a band player and is now on provincial disability, because, as he puts it, he is 'unethically challenged'.

Date registered: N/A
Website: http://josephfurtenbacher.wordpress.com

Robert G. Gauthier
Gauthier, 73, publishes a small local newspaper and is in construction. He is a perennial candidate for office. He ran for mayor in 1997, coming in second with 12.1% of the vote. He ran as an independent in the 2003 provincial election in Ottawa West—Nepean, receiving 0.4% of the vote. He also ran as an independent in the 2004 federal election in Ottawa Centre, receiving 0.2% of the vote. Although he indicated his intention to withdraw, Gauthier remained on the official list of nominees.

Date registered: N/A

Andrew S. Haydon

Haydon, 77, was a Regional Chair for the Ottawa-Carleton Regional Council from 1978 to 1991 and former mayor for the City of Nepean. He was candidate for Gloucester-South Nepean Ward in the 2006 election against Steve Desroches. He was also an advisor for incumbent Mayor Larry O'Brien. Hayden announced his candidacy on September 10, 2010 on the final day of registration for candidates for the election. Hayden who was one of the main actors in the creation of the Ottawa Transitway system, announced his plans for an expanded rapid-transit system without light rail but with a downtown tunnel. He also planned to reform OC Transpo management by having a group of elected representatives taking control of the transit commission. He is regarded as a fiscal conservative, and has often criticized the spending by the current administration.

Endorsements: Gord Hunter, city councillor
Date of announcement: September 10, 2010
Date registered: September 10, 2010
Website: https://web.archive.org/web/20120308213731/http://www.andyhaydon.com/

Robert Larter
Larter, 65 ran in the previous election, and received 0.2% of the vote. He was an unknown candidate who never returned phone calls, didn't show up to all-candidate debates, and the press was unable to find out who he was. There was some news when he reportedly used strong, sometimes racist language whilst emailing other candidates during the election. Larter ran in the Canadian federal election, 2008 in the riding of Ottawa—Vanier as an independent. He received 226 votes, or 0.44% (5th of 7 candidates). Larter dropped out of the mayor race on March 2, but re-entered the race in June. In the meantime, he registered and withdrew himself from running as city councillor in 10 different wards.

Date registered: N/A

Robin Lawrance
Lawrance, 53, was a visually impaired transit activist and former soldier. He ran as an independent candidate in the 1989 Quebec provincial election and later ran for mayor of Cowansville, Quebec. Lawrance was once a supporter of Larry O'Brien. He was born in Scotland, and he emigrated to Canada in 1962. He served in the Canadian Armed Forces. On Friday 23 October 2010, three days before the election, Lawrance was charged with assault with a weapon and assault causing bodily harm.

Date registered: June, 2010

Vincent M. Libweshya
Libweshya, 25, was born in Nairobi, Kenya, and claims to be a distant relative of Barack Obama. He is a musician, entrepreneur and business owner. He had supported Jim Watson, but decided to run on his own.

Date registered: August 5, 2010
Date of campaign launch: August 8, 2010 https://ottawacitizen.com/news/running/3370283/story.html
Website: 

Fraser Liscumb
Liscumb, 62, was the CEO/President of Innovation Hub.

Date registered: September 10, 2010
Date campaign launched: N/A
Website:  Website

Daniel Joseph Lyrette
Lyrette, age unknown, was a licensed optician. He has been with the College of Opticians of Ontario for 42 years.

Date registered: September 10
Date campaign launched: N/A

Mike Maguire
Mike Maguire, 49, was born in Montreal, and has been living in Kars since 1966. He is a graduate of Algonquin College. In 1990 he ran for School Board Trustee. In 2003, he won the Canadian Alliance nomination for the 2004 federal election in Nepean—Carleton, but the party merged with the Progressive Conservatives, nullifying it. He is an independent management consultant and is a former public servant. He worked on both the Terry Kilrea and Larry O'Brien campaigns in the last election.

Date of announcement: February 5, 2010
Date registered: February 5, 2010
Date campaign launched: August 24, 2010
Website: mikeformayor.ca

Larry O'Brien
O'Brien, age 61, had been the mayor since 2006. O'Brien is a graduate of Algonquin College. A businessman by trade, he only entered politics in 2006. He is the former CEO of Calian Technologies Ltd. He lives in the ByWard Market on Rideau Street and describes himself as a conservative.

Endorsements: Senator Art Eggleton, MPP Norm Sterling, MPP Lisa MacLeod, MP Royal Galipeau, former MP Monte Solberg, Elizabeth Manley, Chris Phillips, Jeff Hunt, former councillor Brian McGarry, former MP Barry Turner
Date of announcement: June 30, 2010
Date registered: July 6, 2010
Date campaign launched: September 8, 2010
Website: larryobrien.net

Julio Pita

Date registered: September 10, 2010
Date campaign launched: N/A

Sean Ryan
Ryan, 27, moved from Sault Ste. Marie, Ontario to Ottawa in 2005. He worked at a local software company.

Date of announcement: January 18, 2010
Date registered: January 18, 2010
Date campaign launched: N/A
Website: SeanRyanMayor.com

Michael St. Arnaud
St. Arnaud, 62, was a volunteer at a soup kitchen and church.

Date registered: N/A
Date campaign launched: N/A

Jane Scharf
Scharf, 57, is a longtime political activist in Ottawa who has fought against the Safe Streets Act and other government legislation which she sees as being anti-homeless. She organized a tent city at City Hall and was one of the initial organizers of the Ottawa Panhandlers Union. Scharf ran for mayor in 2006, finishing fourth with 0.5% of the total vote. She is a paralegal.

Date of announcement: January 20, 2010
Date registered: January 20, 2010
Date campaign launched: N/A
Website: JaneScharf.com

Charlie Taylor
Taylor, 33 is a journalism student at Carleton University. He was raised in Westboro and lives in Old Ottawa South. He attended Lisgar Collegiate Institute and Algonquin College and has claimed to have had "about 50 jobs" over 11 years in 45 different countries. In the summer time, he drives a truck for the sound and light show on Parliament Hill. Taylor is a member of the Green Party.

Date of announcement: February 18, 2010
Date registered: February 18, 2010
Date campaign launched: September 9, 2010
Website: www.charlietaylor.ca

Jim Watson
Watson, 48, had been mayor of Ottawa (1997–2000). He was first elected to provincial office in 2003, and he served in the provincial Cabinet as Liberal Minister of Consumer and Business Services (2003–2005), Minister of Health and Promotion (2005–2007), and Minister of Municipal Affairs and Housing (2007–2010). Prior to being mayor, Watson served on Ottawa City Council from 1991 to 1997, representing Capital Ward. Prior to serving on city council, he was in the public service. His first post as Mayor was cut short due to amalgamation. Between 2000 and 2003 he was a journalist. Watson has been a longtime supporter of the Liberal party. In 1996, he supported Dalton McGuinty's bid to lead the Ontario Liberals. Watson lives in the Wood Park neighbourhood. While he was a city councillor, he lived in Old Ottawa South.

Endorsements: David Pratt, former MP and federal cabinet minister; former regional councillor Frank Reid. Jim Durrell, mayor of Ottawa from 1985–1991, Janet Stavinga, former mayor of Goulbourn Township and city councillor from Goulbourn Ward, Mary Pitt, former mayor of Nepean, Guy Cousineau, former mayor of Vanier, Penny Collenette, 2008 Ottawa Centre federal Liberal candidate and local lawyer, Ed Mahfouz, 2008 federal Liberal candidate for Nepean-Carleton, Richard Patten, former Ottawa Centre MPP., and Coun. Christine Leadman, Coun. Peter Hume, the Ottawa Citizen, the Ottawa Sun and Le Droit, Ottawa's French-language daily newspaper.
Date of announcement: January 12, 2010
Date registered: February 1, 2010
Date campaign launched: April 18, 2010. Launched again on September 8.
Website: jimwatson.ca

Samuel Wright

Wright, 25 was a resident of Ottawa's Byward Market. He grew up in Westboro and attended Notre Dame High School.  He was quoted in the August 7, 2010 edition of the Ottawa Citizen'' as saying "I'm a young 25-year-old who loves outdoor activities and cottages" 
Date of announcement: March 11, 2010   
Date registered: March 11, 2010

Withdrawn

Alex Cullen
Cullen, 58, has sat on Ottawa City Council since 2001, representing Bay Ward in Ottawa's west end. He also sat on Ottawa City Council from 1991 to 1994 representing Richmond Ward. After working as a policy analyst with the federal government, he was elected to serve as a public school trustee in 1982. After serving on city council from 1991 to 1994, he was elected exclusively to the Ottawa-Carleton Regional Council from 1994 to 1997 when he was elected to become the Liberal Member of Provincial Parliament for Ottawa West. He served until losing re-election in 1999. While in office, he crossed the floor to join the Ontario NDP. Between 1999 and 2001 he served as an executive director of the Council on Aging, a United Way agency and lobby group for seniors. Cullen dropped out on August 31, 2010, citing low funds. Instead, he ran for re-election in Bay Ward, where he lost.

Date of announcement: April 2, 2009
Date registered: January 4, 2010
Dropped out: August 31, 2010
Website: electalexcullen.ca

Stan Pioro
Pioro, 58, is a resident of Richmond. He was born in Ottawa and is a graduate of DeVry Institute of Technology. He has worked 30 years in Ottawa's high tech industry. He is a small business owner who sells items to the Canadian Forces. Pioro is a Conservative.

Date registered: January 28, 2010
Date withdrawn: September 10, 2010

Eric Romolock
Romolock, 21, is a native of Ottawa and would have been the youngest candidate. At the time, he was a political science student at the University of Ottawa.

Date registered: June 23, 2010
Date withdrawn: September 10, 2010

Gordon Skinner
Date registered: January 12, 2010
Date withdrawn: January 19, 2010

Robert White
Date registered: February 11, 2010
Date withdrawn: March 9, 2010

Mayoral results

Results by ward

Candidates who declined to run
Peggy Feltmate- city councillor.
Peter Hume - city councillor
Gord Hunter- city councillor.
Jacques Legendre- city councillor.

Polls

* Dropped out

City Council

Orléans Ward
Candidates
Renée Greenberg, west end resident
Bob Monette, incumbent
Jennifer Robitaille, purchasing officer with Lanark County
Fred Sherwin, owner & publisher of OrléansOnline.ca

Innes Ward
Candidates
Rainer Bloess, incumbent
Christopher Fraser, public servant and union organizer 
Roger Furmanczyk, retired public servant/financial analyst 
Keith Jansa, occupational health and safety manager at the Canadian Electricity Association and Fallingbrook resident.

Barrhaven Ward
Candidates
Jan Harder, incumbent
Rustin Hollywood, city hall employee with a master's degree in public administration
Joe King, ran in this ward in 2006

Kanata North Ward
Candidates
Hertnz Golmann
Jeff Seeton, recruiting-agency owner
Hal Watson, Military retiree
Lili Weemen, Centretown resident, perennial candidate including for the NDP in the 1993 Canadian federal election in Mississauga—Lakeshore.
Marianne Wilkinson, incumbent

West Carleton-March Ward
Candidates
Alex Aronec, Carleton University student
Eli El-Chantiry, incumbent
James Parsons, landscape business owner and Lavergne Bay resident

Stittsville Ward
Incumbent Shad Qadri had announced his intention and filed his papers for re-election. Richard Eveleigh, an unemployed Downtown Ottawa resident was his only challenger.

Bay Ward
Candidates
Alex Cullen, incumbent
Georges Guirguis, engineer
Peter Heyck, history student
Oni Joseph, community activist
Terry Kilrea, ran in this ward in 2006
Shawn Little, former Kitchissippi Ward councillor
Erik Olesen, student
Mark Taylor, former political aide to Jim Watson and manager of alumni relations at Algonquin College

Ike Awgu, Greg Ross and G.J. Hagenaars dropped out when Cullen announced he was running for re-election, after dropping out of the mayor's race.

College Ward
Candidates
Ralph Anderson, computer programmer. Ran for the National Party of Canada in the 1993 Canadian federal election in Nepean
John Campbell, home inspector 
Rick Chiarelli, incumbent
Catherine Gardner, community advocate and freelance photographer. Chairman of the city's advisory committee on accessibility 
Lynn Hamilton, social worker and public servant. Ran for the NDP in the 2007 Ontario provincial election in Ottawa West—Nepean
Craig MacAulay, retired teacher 
William McKinnon, worked for Ottawa ACORN
Julia Ringma, lawyer

Knoxdale-Merivale Ward
Incumbent Gord Hunter did not run for re-election.
Candidates
James Dean, high-tech worker. Ran unsuccessfully in 2006
Keith Egli, Lawyer and labour relations specialist
Fred Ennis, former radio and print newsman 
Syed Asghar Hussain
Mike Kennedy
Paul Obeda
James O'Grady, Liberal-turned-Green Party volunteer 
Jules Ruhinda, new Ottawa resident
Al Speyers, ran unsuccessfully in 2000 and 2003
Rod Vanier, Liberal candidate in the 2003 Ontario general election in Nepean—Carleton

Gloucester-Southgate Ward
Candidates
Diane Deans, incumbent
Lilly Obina, worked for Bluedrop Performance Learning Inc.
Leslie Saintilma, licensed truck driver
Wade Wallace, Canada Post letter-carrier

Beacon Hill-Cyrville Ward
Candidates
Michel Bellemare, incumbent
O'Neil Brooke, "computer geek"
Tim Tierney, Beacon Hill North Community Association president

Rideau-Vanier Ward
Candidates
Georges Bédard, incumbent
Mathieu Fleury, worked for city's recreation department
Marc Imbeault, public servant  
Andrew Nellis, spokesman for the Ottawa Panhandlers Union
Sriyan Pinnawala, lawyer

Rideau-Rockcliffe Ward
Incumbent Jacques Legendre did not run for re-election
Candidates
Corry Burke, information technology consultant and actor
Richard Cannings, former city councillor 
Peter Clark, former regional chairman
Harley Collison, IT consultant 
Rawlson King, communications expert 
Maurice Lamirande, ran in this ward in 2006. 
Pierre Maheu, French language school trustee
James Parker, Loblaws worker. Ran in this ward in 2003 and 2006.
Sheila Perry, endorsed by Our Ottawa, a coalition of community volunteers. 
Bruce Poulin, former military officer. Has a master's degree in negotiation and mediation.

Somerset Ward
Candidates
Don Fex, theatre director, bookstore manager, arts advocate
Diane Holmes, incumbent
Susan Miller, Shopper's Drug Mart employee. Immigrant from El Salvador
Barkley Pollock, former drop-in centre cook

Kitchissippi Ward
Candidates
Katherine Hobbs, high tech manager and "crime-writing aficionado"
Christine Leadman, incumbent
Daniel Stringer, communications consultant

River Ward
Candidates
Ian Boyd, music merchant, owner of Glebe Compact Music 
Michael Kostiuk, teacher and geographer 
Maria McRae, incumbent
Nadia Willard, anti-poverty activist and former nurse

Capital Ward
Incumbent Clive Doucet ran for mayor instead of the ward.
Candidates
Bob Brocklebank, former Glebe Community Association president
David Chernushenko, former federal and provincial Green Party candidate
Mano Hadavand
Eugene Haslam, owner of Zaphod Beeblebrox 
Ron Le Blanc, public service union executive
Isabel Metcalfe, chair of The Famous Five Committee, trustee on the boards of the Ontario Trillium Foundation and Ottawa Hospital. 
Domenic Santaguida, owner of the Vittoria Trattoria restaurants

Alta Vista Ward
Candidates
Clinton Cowan, labour relations professional
Kevin Hogan, carpenter
Peter Hume, incumbent
Ernie Lauzon, health and safety consultant

Cumberland Ward
Candidates
Stephen Blais, catholic school trustee
Rob Jellett, incumbent councillor 
Patrick Paquette, University of Ottawa graduate

Osgoode Ward
Candidates
Bob Masaro, substitute teacher
Mark Scharfe, cattle farmer and former policeman 
Doug Thompson, incumbent

Rideau-Goulbourn Ward
Candidates
Glenn Brooks, incumbent
Bruce Chrustie
Iain McCallum, ran in this ward in 2006
Scott Moffatt, ran in this ward in 2006
Bruce Webster, President of the Richmond village association

Gloucester-South Nepean Ward
Candidates
Steve Desroches, incumbent
Stephen Knight, school bus driver

Kanata South Ward
Incumbent Peggy Feltmate did not run for re-election.
Candidates
Marc Favreau, manager at the Canadian Food Inspection Agency
Aaron Helleman, engineer for a high tech firm, and owner of an online carpooling business. Endorsed by Feltmate.  
Allan Hubley, federal government manager, long-time community volunteer. Former president of the Glen Cairn Community Association. Ran in this ward in 2006. 
Perry Simpson, government consultant 
Michel Tardif
Rodney Tellez, worked in financial management

School Board Trustee

Ottawa Catholic School Board

Ottawa-Carleton District School Board

Conseil des écoles catholiques du Centre-Est

Conseil des écoles publiques de l'Est de l'Ontario

References

https://web.archive.org/web/20110826024439/http://blogs.canoe.ca/cityhall/election/school-board-election-audits/

External links
Nominated candidates

2010
2010 Ontario municipal elections
election, 2010